Pagewood Studios was a film studio in Sydney, Australia, that was used to make Australian, British and Hollywood films for twenty years.

Creation
The studio was built in 1935 for National Productions by National Studios Ltd, it was originally known as National Studios. It was constructed for the presumed increase in production that most observers thought would result in Australia following introduction of the NSW Film Quota Act. National Studios Ltd was incorporated with capital of £250,000.

They were the first new film studios built in Australia since 1912. Gaumont British helped provide finance and personnel in its construction. After six months of operation National Studios reported a profit of 26%.

However the studio was soon eclipsed by Sydney's two other sound studios, Cinesound and Figtree Studios at Lane Cove. It was shut down for three years from 1937–1940, when it was reopened to make That Certain Something (1940). Then during World War II it was used as a store depot, a training ground, and as the rehearsal and refitting depot of the Australian Army Entertainment Unit.

Revival
The success of The Overlanders (1946) prompted renewed interest in the studios from English companies looking to make movies in Australia. Ealing Studios shot Eureka Stockade (1949) there and eventually took over the studio, putting it under the management of Eric Williams and doing an expensive refurbishment. Ealing used Pagewood for Bitter Springs (1950) and rented it out for Wherever She Goes (1951) and Kangaroo (1952), but plans to film a version of Robbery Under Arms fell through.

Closure
The studio was temporarily shut down again in 1952, which Ken G. Hall called "the worst blow the Australian film industry has ever received, and I believe it is a fatal blow."

A year later it was sold to Associated Television. In 1959 it was sold off completely to Holden manufacturing. Hall later wrote in his memoirs that Pagewood "never did turn out even one commercially successful Australian film".

Films shot at Pagewood

Uncivilised (1936)
The Flying Doctor (1936)
Rangle River (1936)
The Avenger (1936)
Show Business (1938)
Below the Surface (1939)
Dad Rudd, MP (1940)
That Certain Something (1941)
The Power and the Glory (1941)
Eureka Stockade (1949)
Bitter Springs (1950)
Wherever She Goes (1951)
Kangaroo (1952)
Long John Silver (1954)
Smiley (1956)
Robbery Under Arms (1957)
Smiley Gets a Gun (1958)
Summer of the Seventeenth Doll (1959)

References

Australian film studios